WAM was originally formed as the Western Australian Rock Music Industry Association Inc. (WARMIA) in 1985, with its main aim to develop and run annual awards recognising achievements within the music industry in Western Australia. WAM first received project funding from the state government in 1989, and in the early 90s the word "rock" was dropped from the title to give the organisation scope to take on a broader constituency.

In 1989 the inaugural WA Song Contest commenced, in 2002 it was rebranded as the WAM Song of the Year.

The WAM Song of the Year is open to all residents of Western Australia. The song must be the original work of the songwriter(s). Songwriters with a publishing deal can only enter the Professional category.

Winners

1985–1988

1989–2002
 1996 Grand Prize – Exteria
 1997 Grand Prize – Beaverloop
 1998 Grand Prize – Cartman
 2000 Grand Prize – Ivan Zar
 2001 Grand Prize – Halogen

2003
In 2003 there were 1,247 entries and 75 shortlisted nominees in the 15 genre categories. Winners each received $1,000 (Children & Youth winners received $500) and a days recording time at a top Perth studio.  The Grand Prize winner received the opportunity to have a promotional single recorded, pressed and released among other select opportunities.

The individual category award winners were:
Children – "Something More" – Wesley Fuller
Country – "Asbestos Fibro" – ADM Powell
Easy Listening Pop/R'n'B – "Back 2 those Timez" – Chanelle
Electronic/Hip Hop – "Boy X Girl Y" – Johnson, Vernie
Hard Rock/Metal/ Punk – "Reprisal" – Simon Pilkington, Aaron Smith
Indi Pop/Rock – "Andy Warhol" – Little Birdy
Indigenous – "Raining on Djilba" – George Walley
Jazz/ Funk – "That Hurt" – Myles Wright
Love – "Walking Over Sea" – Sam Dunn, Ben Dunn
Political – "Georgie Boy" – Andrew Horabin
Roots – "Sheba Lane" – Lynn Hazelton
Songs for Kids – "Pirlpirltji" – L. Hazelton, A. Ovi, S. Stanford
Soundtrack/ Filmscore/Experimental – "Green Lantern" – Johannes Luebbers
World/Multicultural – "Day Oh" – Eloy Cardenas

2004
The WAM Song of the Year for 2004 was announced at the Fly by Night Club in Fremantle on Thursday 16 September 2004. The evening featured performances from past winners including Andrew Horabin and Lynn Hazelton, as well as finalists for the 2005 competition. The WAM Song of the Year was presented by the Minister for the Arts the Hon. Sheila McHale.  There was over 1,300 songs entered in the competition with 75 works nominated by the industry panels as finalists in the 15 genre categories.

The individual category award winners were:
Commercial/Contemporary Pop – "Breathe" – Cassie Swinney, Alistair Watson & Escher
Country – "Dirty Liar" – Rob Findlay & Haley Mason
Electronic/Dance Category – "Hit '5'" – Tim Macnamara & Diego Bosco
Hard Rock/Metal –  "Bay of Martyrs" – Mike Sukys
Indie Rock/Punk Category – "Tread Easy" – The Bank Holidays
Jazz – "West Bank Moon" – Michael Pigneguy & Sian Brown
Roots – "Slipping With the Blues" – Gerard Maunick
Urban – "Wait a Minute" – Tsunami & Nathan Jamieson
Love – "Blame Me" – Frans Bisschops, Jasmine Yee & Michael Miller
Gospel – "Take Over" – Chad Blondel
ASME Upper Secondary (Years 11–12) – "Radio Play" – Melissa Erpen
ASME Lower Secondary (Years 8–10) – "Home Sweet Home" – Danni Stefanetti
ASME Primary Category – "Sidewalk Surfer" – The Flairz
Indigenous – "Hardway" – The Hill (John Bullen, Jarred Wall)
Outstanding Regional Song  – "Time for You to Go" – Lauren Brede

2005
The WAM Song of the Year for 2005 was announced at the Fly By Night Club in Fremantle on Thursday 27 October 2005. The evening featured performances from past winners including Andrew Horabin and Lynn Hazelton, as well as finalists for the 2005 competition. Performing on the night were The Bank Holidays, Lake of Bass, New Rules For Boats, Peter Brandy, The Flairz and the 2004 Song of the Year winner, Lauren Brede. The WAM Song of the Year was presented by the Minister for the Arts the Hon. Sheila McHale.  There were close to 1,500 songs entered in the competition with 86 works nominated by the industry panels as finalists in the 17 genre categories.

The individual category award winners were:
Blues & Roots – "4 Men Dead" – Kevin Smith
Country – "Lord I Want an Exit" – Emily Barker
Electronic/Dance – "We Gave Colour Away" – Harvey Rae and Hiro? (Thread)
Gospel – "Learning to Say" – Mark Cullen
Heavy Rock/Metal – "Falling" – Shannon de Bie
Indigenous Song of the Year – "Long Time Ago" – Peter Brandy
Jazz – "Storm" – Marnie Kent and Grant Windsor (Ginger Blu Collective)
Love – "Drunkard's Wife" – Pete Stone
Mixed Bag – "Then You Appear" – Damian Crosbie (The Panda Band)
Pop – "Sleepy Little Death Toll Town" – Damian Crosbie (The Panda Band)
Regional Song of the Year – "Lord I Want an Exit" – Emily Barker
Rock – "Information" – Sascha Ion, Ronan Charles, Stuart Leach (One Horse Town)
School Primary School Aged – "Holey Cheeses" – Oliver Bradley, Albert Loss
School Lower Secondary School Aged – "Memory Lane" – Wesley Fuller
School Upper Secondary School Aged – "The Best is Yet to Come" – Ben Blondel
Urban – "Take 5" – Tsunami
World and Folk – "Long Time Ago" – Peter Brandy

2006
The WAM Song of the Year for 2006 was announced on Thursday 19 October 2006 at the Fly By Night Club in Fremantle with awards in 17 different categories. Performing on the night were Kavyen Temperley from Eskimo Joe, The Panda Band, Abbe May and The Rockin' Pneumonia, One Horse Town, the Catherine Noblet Quartet and The Watts. Presenters from Xpress Magazine, The West Australian, RTRFM, ABC Radio, Nova 93.7, Drum Media, Network 10, APRA, Perth International Arts Festival and Minister for the Arts, the Honorable Sheila McHale announced the winners. The winners of most categories were awarded $1,000 cash and 1 day of recording time in a leading Perth studio. The winner of the Grand Prize received an additional 3 days recording time with producer Rob Grant at Poons Head Studios and the pressing of 500 promotional singles/EPs through Westlink Multimedia/MGM.

The individual category award winners were:

Blues/Roots – "Sidewindin'" – Abbe May
Country – "Live on Love" by Polly (Kylie) Medlen
Electronic/Dance by "These Times" – David McKinney, Rachel Claudio
Gospel by "Flowers in the Desert" – Jeremy Dixon
Heavy Rock/Metal by "Drag in Drag Out" – Kevin Curran, Todd Fishwick
Indigenous – "Our Song" by Jason Bartlett and Phillip Bartlett
Jazz – "Wanderer" by Catherine Noblet
Love – "Old Folks, Drunks and Babies" by Sascha Ion
Mixed Bag – "It's a PC 21st Century New Millennium Romantic Arrangement..." by Andrew Horabin
Pop by "City Walls and Empires" – Erik Hecht (Institut Polaire)
Regional – "Call of the Wild" by Xavier Brown
Rock – "Red Means Go" by B. Mulvena-Trinder, I. Berney, J. Sher, C. Palmer
School Primary – Free by "Matt Larsen"
School Lower Secondary by "Shadows of a City" – E. Hamilton, G. Hutchings, M. Mackintosh, L. Osborn
School Upper Secondary – "Happy Birthday Dave" by Matt Gresham
Urban – "Lose Control" by S.Roy, C.Wancer (Roy-Al feat. Cristian Alexanda)
World/Folk – "Mon Ankor Anmourer" by Grace Barbé, James Searle

2007
The 2007 WAM Song of the Year was announced at the Fly By Night in Fremantle, on Wednesday 31 October 2007. There were eighteen category winners and included for the first year a professional category where published Western Australian based songwriters are given the chance to enter their works in WA's premier song writing Awards. 

The individual category award winners were:

Blues 'n' Roots – "Lara Clare" by Craig Sinclair
Country – "Take Me With You" by Polly Medlen
Electronic / Dance – "Hot Property" by Hayley McLennan and Simon Sieradzki
Gospel – "My Hallelujah" by Paul Morrison
Heavy Rock/Metal – "Broken Eyes" by Brett Jones, Johnny Kyi & Nigel Watts
Indigenous – "Kick the Monkey" by Jason Bartlett & Phillip Bartlett
Jazz – "Curious Yellow" by Adrian Kelly
Mixed Bag – "Bring Out Your Dead" by Schvendes
Love – "There is a Room on Hold" by James Crombie & Wibekke Reczek 
Pop – "Holidayz" by Josh Fontaine
Professional – "Sun Dirt Water" by The Waifs
Regional – "Two Months" by Polly Medlen
Rock – "The World or Nothing" by Scott Tomlinson, Greg Sanders, Brenton Bell & Dayvid Clark
Primary – "Valley of Flowers" by Madi MacDougall & Erika McKay
Secondary (Lower) – "Wishing on a Star" by Jordi Davieson
Secondary (Upper) – "Overcast Day" by Timothy Nelson
Urban – "Get By" by Glen Foreman, Scott Griffiths & Alex Plant
World and Folk – "Moodjebing" by Jessie Lloyd & Della Rae Morrison

2008
The 2008 WAM Song of the Year was announced at the Fly By Night in Fremantle, on Thursday 9 October 2008. The 85 nominees in 17 categories were announced on Monday 22 September. The Grand Prize for the WAM Song of the Year 2008 included a cash prize of $5,000, together with a 3-day recording session at Poons Head Recording Studio and 500 CDs by DiskBank.

For the first time, the public were invited to listen to and vote for a nominee in the Most Popular Song category. Public voting was later cancelled after claims of technical issues allowing multiple votes, it was replaced by judging by Sunday Times and PerthNOW entertainment staff. The professional category was also cancelled due to lack of numbers. Over 400 songwriters from throughout Western Australia submitted 1640 songs, the second highest number of entries received in the competition's 19-year history.

The 18 award winners were: 
 Blues & Roots – "Howl And Moan" by Abbe May
 Café – "Revien" by Cloud Kollektiv
 Country – "Place Where I Belong" by Phyllis Bennell (Warangka Band)
 Electronic/Dance – "Realizing" by Cloud Kollektiv
 Gospel – "Light" by Lindsay Hamminga
 Heavy Rock/Metal – "Refuse the Sickness" by Chaos Divine
 Indigenous – "Gundulla – We Dance" by Yabu Band
 Jazz – "Til Death Does Me Part" by Johannes Luebbers
 Mixed Bag – "The Land" by Abraham Dunovits (Funkalleros)
 Pop – "Feel" by Roly Skender and The Tonics
 Regional – "Kaya" by Charmaine Bennell (Warangka Band), from Bunbury WA
 Rock – "Howl And Moan" by Abbe May
 School, Primary – "Shadows" by Josephine Langford
 School, Secondary Lower – "Smile" by Mike Nutt
 School, Secondary Upper – "The Pony and the Ark" by Lyndon Blue
 Urban – "Behind The Curtain" by Emcee Able
 World & Folk – "Kaya" by Charmaine Bennell (Warangka Band)

2008 Grand Prize
As judged by an independent industry panel from all category winners. 
 "Feel" by Roly Skender and The Tonics

2008 Most Popular Song
As judged by The Sunday Times and PerthNOW entertainment staff from all nominated songs. 
 "Give Up Money For Music" by Robert Sazdov (BSYDE)

2009
The 2009 WAM Song of the Year was announced at the Fly By Night Musicians' Club in Fremantle.
 
The sixteen award winners were:
Blues and Roots – "Lover Don't You Wanna" by DivCraft
Cafe – "Era Quondam" by Minute 36
Country – "Sleeping Alone" by Timothy Nelson
Electronic/Dance – "They Wanna Dance" by Scott Tomlinson
Experimental – "A Vexing Predicament" by Tangled Thoughts of Leaving
Heavy – "Total Existence Failure" by Voyager
Indigenous – "Here I Go" by Black Poet
Jazz – "Thinking Without Thinking" by Tilman Robinson
Mentally Healthy – "I'm Not Scared" by Black Board Minds
Pop – "Streamers" by Umpire
Regional – "Spirit Calling" by Simon and Tammy London
Rock – "Acute" by Sugar Army
Schools 14 Yrs and below – "Everything" – Convict X
Schools 15–17 Yrs – "Rocket Ship" by King George
Urban – "Skyhawks" by Mathas
World/Folk – "Son of a Son of a King" by Michael Strong and The Ghost Anyway

2009 Grand Prize
 "Streamers" by Umpire

2009 Popular Vote
 "Run for the Hills" by The Words

2010
The 2010 WAM Song of the Year was announced at the Fly By Night Musicians' Club in Fremantle. 
 
The sixteen award winners were:

Blues and Roots – "Hoborockabilly" by The Wilderness
Country – "Juliette" by The Ghost Hotel
Electronic/Dance – "Into Another" by Matt Mclean
Experimental – "Scene from a Window" by Rachel Dease
Heavy – "Behold" by Dsycord
Indigenous – "I Was Singing for the Good Times" by Azzy Bartlett & Kyle Bartlett 
Jazz – "The Deep Fryer" by Chris Sealey
Love – "Take it Slow" by Slackjaw & Episode
Mentally Healthy – "Rag Doll" by Simone Keane
Pop – "Lay the Noose" by Schvendes
Regional – "Burning" – Simone Keane
Rock – "Mis Adventure" by Sons of Rico
Schools 14 Yrs and below – "This Ground" – Jake Wylde
Schools 15–17 Yrs – "Breakfast in Bedlam" by Georgi Kay
Urban – "Nothin 2 Say" by Jarrid Allen, Andrew Wright & Brooke Wilkie
World/Folk – "The Silver Yacht" by Rachel & Henry Climb a Hill

2010 Grand Prize
 "Breakfast in Bedlam" by Georgi Kay

2010 Popular Song
 "Take Me Home" by Them Little Secrets and Fred Rea

2011 
2011 WAM Song of the Year was announced by Russell Woolf (Presenter – ABC News Weather & 720 ABC Perth Drive program), at the Fly By Night Musicians' Club.

The sixteen award winners were:

Blues and Roots – "Overdrive" by Matt Cal
Country – "Wheatbelt" by Gary Dobbin 
Electronic/Dance – "My Love's (Not Good Enough)" by Bastian's Happy Flight
Experimental – "They Found My Skull in the Nest of a Bird" by Tangled Thoughts of Leaving 
Heavy – "Throw Us to the Wind" by Tangled Thoughts of Leaving 
Indigenous – "Wangkaja" by John Bennett
Jazz – "Another New Beginnings Again" by Elliot Hughes 
Love – "Speak the Truth in Love" by Timothy Nelson 
Mentally Healthy – "Reason to Live" by Complete 
Pop – "51 Swimsuits" by The Panda Band 
Regional – " Until the Siren Sounds" by Junior Bowles 
Rock – "Sally" by Sam Carmody
Schools 14 Yrs and below – "I Miss Her" by Katharine Penkin 
Schools 15–17 Yrs – "Unkind" by Morgan Bain
Urban / Hip Hop – "Free" by The Stoops featuring Georgie Kay 
World/Folk – "Another Sunday Morning" by Rhys Wood

2011 Grand Prize
"Speak the Truth in Love" by Timothy Nelson

2012 
2012 WAM Song of the Year was hosted by Darren de Mello from 96FM at the Fly By Night Musicians Club. Rainy Day Women took out the Grand Prize.
Performances included Kucka, Yabu Band, Timothy Nelson & amp; The Infidels, and Boom! Bap! Pow!

The sixteen award winners were:
Blues and Roots – "Driller" by Dilip n the Davs
Country – "Take Me Home" by The Ghost Hotel 
Electronic/Dance – "Slew" by Ylem 
Experimental – "Polly (serialkillersundays)" by Kučka
Heavy – " Walk Away" by The Sixth Extinction 
Indigenous – "Born on the River" by Jarred Wall [Jake and the Cowboys] 
Jazz – "Maelstrom" by Abbey/Foster/Falle 
Love – " Falling Outta Love" by Brian Mitra & Jake Webb
Mentally Healthy – " Petrol Paint & Glue" by Yabu Band 
Pop – " Sleigh Bed" by Rainy Day Women
Regional – "Heart of a Lion" by Codie Sundstrom 
Rock – " Ordinary" by Husband 
Schools 14 Yrs and below – " Inside and Out" by Lucinda Nicholls 
Schools 15–17 Yrs – "I Think I've Got You" by Morgan Bain 
Urban / Hip Hop – " The Ego-dystonic Blues" by FG 
World/Folk – "Mother's Petunias" by Brayden Sibbald

2012 Grand Prize
"Sleigh Bed" by Rainy Day Women

2013 
2013 WAM Song of the Year was held at Fly By Night Musicians Club in February 2013. Taking out the Grand Prize, producer Mathas, was awarded the Grand Prize for his song "Nourishment" (also featuring Abbe May). Performances on the night included Rainy Day Women, The Ghost Hotel, Ylem & Deas and Odette Mercy & Her Soul Atomics.

The sixteen award winners were:
Blues and Roots – "High Tide" by Jordan McRobbie 
Country – "First And Last" by Graphic Fiction Heroes  
Electronic/Dance – "Nourishment" by Mathas (featuring Abbe May)
Experimental – "So We Beat On, Boats Against The Current" by Cycle~ 440
Folk – "No Such Thing as Waste" by Formidable Vegetable Sound System 
Heavy – "Frankenstein" by Sleepfreak 
Indigenous – "Friends" by Jarred Wall of Jake and the Cowboys 
Jazz – "Avina" by Nick Abbey
Mentally Healthy – " Hurting Bird" by Rachel Gorman 
Love – "Falling Outta Love" by Brian Mitra & Jake Webb [Sugarpuss] 
Pop – "Suit" by Boom! Bap! Pow! 
Regional – "Three States" by Minute 36 (Albany) 
Rock – "Body Unbind" by Eleventh He Reaches London
Schools 14 & Under – "Listen" by Emmanuel Navarro aka ENAV 
Schools 15–17 Yrs – "Could Love" by Julia Nicholls 
Urban / Hip Hop – "Nourishment" by Mathas feat Abbe May 
World –  "ANANTH: The Endless Dance" by 7 Beats

2013 Grand Prize
 "Nourishment" by Mathas (featuring Abbe May)

2014 
2014 WAM Song of the Year was held at the B Shed warehouse in Fremantle, with Kučka taking out the Grand Prize.Performances on the night included: Methyl Ethel and Grace Barbé, plus Lilt and DJ John Safari.

The category winners were:
Blues and Roots: "Hold On" by Morgan Bain
Country: "Wrap Me in a Fever" by Ruby Boots 
Electronica: "Unconditional" by Kučka
Experimental: "Earthquake" by Intenso Band
Folk: "Tell My Lover" by Winter's Mile
Heavy Metal: "Soldiers" by Chaos Divine
Jazz: "Charon" by Trisk
Outstanding Indigenous: "Ready to Love" by The Merindas
Outstanding Regional: "Ain't Got Time for That" by Codee-Lee
Pop: "Rogues" by Methyl Ethel
Punk/Hardcore: "Wood & Wire" by Rag n' Bone
Rock: "I Don't Think You Like Me" by Tired Lion
Schools 14 & Under: "Hurricane" by Charlotte Viney
Schools 15 – 17: "Seasons" by Mike Waller
Urban / Hip Hip: "Someone" by Coin Banks
World: "Fatige" by Grace Barbé

2014 Grand Prize
 "Unconditional" by Kučka

2015 / 2016 
The 2015 / 2016 WAM Song of the Year was held on 9 April 2016. Beni Bjah became the first ever Indigenous artist to take the top honours.

The category winners were:
 Blues / Roots: "River" by Katie J White
 Country: "Melita Station" by Lynn Hazelton & Bill Chambers
 Electronic: "Trenchtown 2020" by Tobacco Rat
 Experimental: "Shaking Off Futility" by Tangled Thoughts of Leaving
 Folk: "My Love Affair With Archer" by Galloping Foxleys
 Heavy Metal: "Badge of Honour" by Chaos Divine
 Jazz: "Pius Bartosik" by Daniel Susnjar Afro-Peruvian Jazz Group
 Outstanding Indigenous: "Survivors" by Beni Bjah
 Pop: "War and Porn" by Joni in the Moon
 Punk / Hardcore: "Monarch" by Nerve Quakes
 Outstanding Regional: "Didge It" by Fingers Mitchell Cullen
 Rock: "Death Rattle Waltz" by Rag n' Bone
 Schools 14 & Under: "Stronger" by Madi Henry
 Schools 15 – 17: "With You" by Charlotte Viney
 Urban / Hip Hop: "Pause" by Marksman Lloyd (featuring Coin Banks & Nic Di Lena, Prod. Sable)
 World: "Blame Lulu Peanuts – Metsahällilaul" by Eastwinds

2015/16 Grand Prize 
"Survivors" by Beni Bjah

2016 / 2017 
The 2016 / 2017 WAM Song of the Year was held on 17 May 2017.

The category winners were:
 Blues / Roots: "The Prince" by Dan Howls 
 Country: "Caught in the Crossfire" by Ralway Bill
 Electronic: "Infra" by Tobacco Rat
 Experimental: "As Steadfast As the Ether Itself" by The Intenso Band
 Folk: "Seasick" by Riley Pearce
 Heavy Metal: "Nucleust" by Of King & Tree
 Jazz: "Ignacio" by Harry Mitchell
 Outstanding Indigenous: "The Man of Calvary" by The Brownley Gospel Singers
 Pop: "When We Were Young" by Sydnee Carter
 Punk / Hardcore: "Pissy Flow" by Rag n' Bone
 Outstanding Regional: "Heart Is a Compass" by Codee Lee
 Rock: "Carbon Copy" by High Horse 
 Schools 14 & Under: "Meaning of Life" by Farraday's Cage
 Schools 15 – 17: "Djarliny" by Burdiya Mob
 Urban / Hip Hop: "Meant to Do" by Macshane 
 World: "Taste of Honey" by Jere Sosa

2016/17 Grand Prize 
"When We Were Young" by Sydnee Carter

2017 / 2018 
The 2017 / 2018 WAM Song of the Year was held on 16 May 2018 at Fly By Night Musicians Club in Fremantle.

The category winners were:
 Blues / Roots: "Lies" by Carus Thompson
 Country: "Maybe I'm Just in Love" by The Little Lord Street Band
 Electronic: "Prior Engagement" by Feels
 Experimental: "The One" by Intenso
 Folk: "I Only Hide" by Helen Shanahan
 Heavy Metal: "Man is Wolf to Man Part 2" by Bolt Gun
 Jazz: "Don't Stop Here" by Harry Mitchell
 Outstanding Indigenous: "Country Is Calling" by John Bennett
 Pop: "Boys Will Be Boys" by Stella Donnelly
 Punk / Hardcore: "Magic Glove" by The Bob Gordons
 Outstanding Regional: "Country Is Calling" by John Bennett
 Rock: "A Boy and a Boy" by J.F.K
 Schools 14 & Under: "The Fire Inside" by Farraday's Cage
 Schools 15 – 17: "Ear to Lend" by Figurehead
 Urban / Hip Hop: "Be Real" by Coin Banks (featuring Danny Martin)
 World: "Same Drum" by Akolkol Dastan Gesa

2017/18 Grand Prize 
"Boys Will Be Boys" by Stella Donnelly

2018 / 2019 
The 2018 / 2019 WAM Song of the Year was held on 26 June 2019.

The category winners were:
 Act-Belong-Commit: "Are You Okay?"by Pat Chow
 Blues / Roots: "Old Man of the Blues" by Tom Fisher and The Layabouts
 Country: "Letter to a Baby Girl" by The Eastern Line
 Electronic: "They Need Us" by Feels (featuring Stella Donnelly)
 Experimental: "a moment like this..?" by Stephen de Filippo
 Folk: "Elephants" by Riley Pearce
 Heavy Metal: "Perished Walls Speak" by Elderflower
 Jazz: "Song for Days When" by Nick Abbey
 Outstanding Indigenous: "Flewnt" by Kya Kyana
 Pop: "The Hunting Birds" by Currents
 Punk / Hardcore: "Derby Jetty" by Trolley Boys
 Outstanding Regional: "Spider's Web" by Brayden Sibbald
 Rock: "Greg's Discount Chemist" by Carla Geneve
 Schools 14 & Under: "Shattered Heart" by Ava Sharp
 Schools 15 – 17: "Can't Help This Feeling" by Electrocity Ensemble
 Urban / Hip Hop: "Flewnt" by Kya Kyana
 World: "Bahar" by Tara Tiba

2018/19 Grand Prize 
"Greg's Discount Chemist" by Carla Geneve

2020 
The 2020 WAM Song of the Year was held on 29 July 2020. Taking out the overall Grand Prize win for the second year in a row was Albany born singer-songwriter Carla Geneve with her song, "2001".

The category winners were:
 Act-Belong-Commit: "Home" by Indigo Ellis
 Blues / Roots: "Take Me Down" by Karin Page
 Country: "Half Frozen Beer" by Jack Davies and The Bush Chooks
 Electronic: "Alchemise" by Grievous Bodily Calm
 Experimental: "Existence is Exile & Nothingness, Home" by Bolt Gun
 Folk: "Things Change" by Carla Geneve
 Global: "Mardilo" by Grace Barbé
 Heavy Metal: "Dead Rat" by RATSALAD
 Outstanding Indigenous: "I Don't Wanna Be" by MissGenius
 Jazz: "Sketches" by Harry Mitchell
 Pop: "Catch Up" by The Hunting Birds 
 Punk / Hardcore: "Gatorade" by HUSSY
 Outstanding Regional: "Never Let Me Know" by The Gusset  
 Rock: "2001" by Carla Geneve
 Schools 14 & Under: "Home" by Indigo Ellis
 Schools 15 – 17: "In Memory of" by Vmarie
 Urban / Hip Hop: "Bad Like Ri Ri"  Adrian Dzvuke (featuring POW! Negro)

2020 Grand Prize 
 "2001" by Carla Geneve

2021 
The 2021 WAM Song of the Year was held on 22 September 2021.

The category winners were:
 Act-Belong-Commit: "Always Was Always Will Be" by Natasha Eldridge
 Blues / Roots: "Just the Way It Is" by Siobhan Cotchin
 Country: "Ngaalang Moort/Ngany Koorlangka (My Kid)" by Cindy Moody and Phil Bartlett
 Electronic: "Coppola" by Maver featuring Marksman Lloyd
 Experimental: "Coodamurup" by Jean-Michel Maujean 
 Folk: "Biding Time" by Timothy Nelson
 Global: "Warri Yungu, Warri Baba" by Warralgurniya
 Heavy Metal: "Hunter" by The Harvest Trail
 Hip Hop: "Darling" by Adrian Dzvuke
 Outstanding Indigenous: "Malu Mabu Liyan" by Matalja
 Jazz: "Cantuta" by Daniel Susnjar 
 Pop: "Grid" by Wasteland and Sydnee Carter 
 Punk / Hardcore: "Bloke" by RATSALAD
 Outstanding Regional: "Afterglow" by Brayden Sibbald   
 Rock: "It Gets Worse" by Pat Chow 
 Schools 14 & Under: "Old Land's Tale" by Angelina Curtis
 Schools 15 – 17: "Left Shoe" by Detour 

2021 Grand Prize 
 "Just the Way It Is" by Siobhan Cotchin

2022
The 2022 ceremony was staged at Freo.Social on 21 September 2022

 Act Belong Commit: Iconyx - "Dawn of the Future"
 Blues & Roots: Angie Colman - "Maths"
 Country: Codee-Lee - "Smoke & Mirrors"
 Electronic: PROJECT BEXX - "Don't Touch Me"
 Experimental: Dan Sutherland - "Bridges"
 Folk: Finn Pearson Band -"No Apologies"
 Global: Kate Pass Kohesia Ensemble - "Black Mountain"
 Heavy/ Metal: Darkmatter - "Parasite Culture"
 Hip Hop/ New R&B:Supathick & Adrian Dzvuke (featuring Keely Brittain) - "July"
 Jazz: Artemis Orchestra - "The Elephant in the Room"
 Outstanding Indigenous: Patrick Woodley & Lauralee Faith - "Something 'bout You Baby"
 Outstanding Regional: Dr Tasty - "Hopscotch"
 Pop: South Summit - "River Days"
 Punk/ Hardcore: RATSALAD - "Chicken Lips"
 Rock: Carla Geneve - "Dog Eared"
 Schools 14 Under: Elianie - "Moonlight"
 Schools 15-18: Mia June - "Fish in a Bowl"
 
2022 Grand Prize 
 Dr Tasty - "Hopscotch"

See also
 West Australian Music Industry Awards

References

Music competitions in Australia
Australian music awards
Culture of Western Australia
Song awards